Lahijan (also known as, Lāyjon in Gilaki) is a city near the Caspian Sea and the capital of Lahijan County, Gilan Province, Iran.  According to the 2016 census, its population was 101,073.

Lahijan has a mix of traditional and modern architecture. The city, which has an Iranian-European urban structure, lies on the northern slope of the Alborz Mountains. Its culture and favourable climatic condition have made Lahijan a major tourist hub in northern Iran. The city is basically founded on the sediments remaining from big rivers in Gilan, including the Sepid/Sefid-Rud (White River). Historically, the city was the major business center and the capital of East Gilan during the time of special rulers. Lahijan has also been a tourism hub of the Islamic world during different eras in Iran's history.

Etymology
The word "Lahijan" is originated from the economic stance the city had during its historical periods. "Lāhijān" is formed by two words: Lah, means silk and "Jan or Gan" means a place where something is done. Therefore, by compounding these two parts, the word "Lahijan or lahigan" was made, which means "a place to obtain silk fiber".

Professor Bahram Farah'vashi, who is an Iranian expert in ancient languages, says that in the Middle Persian Language; Lah refers to silk, and in Decisive Argument; Lah means the red silk. Therefore, Lahygan (today, Lahijan) is an area where silk is obtained.

History
In ancient times, Gilan region was divided between 'the Caspian' and 'the Golha' (flowers) sub-regions. Before Iran's provincial divisions into the current state, Gilan was divided by the Sefid-Rud River into eastern and western regions. The river's eastern side was called Biehpish, and the western side was called Biehpas. At some point in time, Lahijan became the capital of Biehpish. This region has been one of Iran's major silk-producing centers as well as the country's first area for the tea-plantation set out by Prince Mohammad Mirza.

Prince Mohammad Mirza, known as "Kashef-ol-Saltaneh," was the first mayor of Tehran. As the Iranian ambassador to India under British rule, he knew the British would not allow him to learn about the secrets of tea production, as it was their biggest business in India at the time. So being fluent in French, the prince pretended to be a French laborer and started to work in the tea plantations and factories to learn how to produce tea. Ultimately his plan was to take back some samples of this tea to Iran to cultivate. He was successful in this endeavor only because of his diplomatic immunity which stopped the British from searching his secretly stashed sample. His mausoleum in Lahijan is now part of the "Iran Tea Museum".

The foundation of Lahijan is attributed to 'Lahij Ebne Saam'. Oljaito, the Mongol ruler conquered Lahijan in 705 AH. Then Amir Teimoor attacked this region. Finally, Shah Abbas I defeated 'Khan Ahmad' and thereafter the Safavid governors ruled this city. Some events in the history of this city include: An outbreak of plague in 703, the conflagration of 850, and the occupation of Lahijan by the Russian army in June 1725. Lahijan was one of the main bases of the Jungle Movement.

Geography

Lahijan population enjoys a climate known as "moderate Caspian". This weather pattern emerged from the influence of the currents of both the Alborz Mountains slopes and the Caspian Sea. But before knowing about this weather pattern, we should discuss the model of climate system and Gilan's spatial geo system.

Gilan includes the north-western end of the Alborz chain and the western part of the Caspian lowlands of Persia. The mountainous belt is cut through by the deep transverse valley of the Sefid-Rud between Manjil and Eemamzadeh Hashem near Rasht, the capital of Gilan Province. To the northwest, the Talesh highlands stretch a continuous watershed separating Gilan and Azerbaijan.

Their eastern and north-eastern side is deeply carved by parallel streams flowing down towards the Caspian, resulting in a comb-shaped pattern. The western Alborz itself, to the east of the Safid-rud valley, is wider and more intricate, with three parallel (WNW-ESE) ranges; the southernmost and lowest one is represented in Gilan by the Asman-sara Kuh in the Ammarlu district; the medium one is the most continuous, from the Kuh-e-Dalfak to the Keram Kuh, whereas the transverse valley of Polrud clearly divides the northern range into Kuh-e-Natesh and Kuh-e-Somam or Somamus, the highest spot of Gilan.
All these mountains have a very complicated geological structure and tectonic history which connects them to the structural complex of central Persia.

Though all those mountains cover a greater area than the plains, these are the most specific feature of the province, and locally, the word Gilan often refers to the plain areas or particularly to the central plain.

This large parallelogram of lowlands is heterogeneous and can be divided into two main parts: The delta of the Safid-rud in the east and the Fumanat plain in the west. The former has been entirely built by the Safid-rud, a river with a high discharge and a high alluvial content. The higher part is made out of coarse ancient alluvial material, whereas in the lower part, north of Astaneh-e Ashrafiyyeh, the river often changed its course through thin silty and clayey material; it has thus abandoned its former northeastward course, which flowed into the sea at the prominent angle of the plain near Dastak, and presently flows northwards and builds a smaller living delta jutting out into the Caspian between Zibakenar and Bandar kiashahr.

The Fumanat plain to the west intermingles marine alluvial deposits and former sandy beach-lines with abundant alluvial deposits from the numerous rivers draining the southern part of Talesh highlands. They do not reach directly the sea, but converge into the lagoon of Anzali with a single outlet to the Caspian through the dune-covered sandy coastline. The lagoon is constantly getting smaller and shallower under the effect of silting. On the contrary, the streams of northern Talesh and eastern Gilan, even the more abundant Polrud, do not bring alluvium enough to counterbalance the action of a coastal current going eastward, and thus could not build more than a narrow ribbon of lowlands, only a few kilometers wide between Astara and Safid-rud and to the east of Qasemabad, and some 10 km wide at the mouth of the Polrud around kelachay.

Climate and weather

The topographic position of the Caspian lowlands results in a very characteristic Hyrcanian climate, and the whole province of Gilan belongs to this humid and green area. Prevailing north-south atmospheric currents, humidified over the Caspian, are forced to a vigorous ascendancy by the mighty barrier of Alborz and thus pour abundant rainfall all year long on both the plain and the north-western slope of the mountains. The precipitation regime shows a sharp maximum in autumn (September to December), when atmospheric instability is at its highest point, medium values in winter and early spring, and lowest values from May to August.

Mean annual rainfall varies between 1200 and 1800 mm along the shoreline, decreases towards a sub-humid area in the south-western corner of the, and reaches again very high amounts in the lower part of the mountain, up to 1500–1800 mm. Along the Safid-rud valley, swept every afternoon in summer by the violent northerly Manjil wind (Tholozan), a very rapid transition leads to the Mediterranean-like semi-arid area of Rudbar and Manjil.

The climatic privilege of Gilan explains its luxuriant natural vegetation.

According to altitude, three forest levels can be distinguished: The Hyrcanian mixed forests, the mountain beech forest, and the High Mountain oak and hornbeam forest. The Hyrcanian forest stricto sensu once covered the plains, where only residual patches remain on coarse alluvial terraces between cultivated areas, and still covers the greater part of the first slopes of the mountains up to about 1000 m.

It is a stratified forest, with a layer of very tall trees such as the endemic chestnut-leaved oak (boland-mazu; Quercus castaneaefolia), Siberian elm (derakht-e-azad; Zelkova crenata) and iron tree (anjili; Parrotia persica) and more common elms, maples, and hornbeams (ulas); a layer of smaller trees like the endemic Gleditchia caspica (lilaki), Diospyros lotus (kalhu), and Albizzia julibrissin (shabkhosb), boxwood (shemshad) in shady spots and all kinds of wild fruit trees; and an underwood with evergreen bushes such as Prunus laurocerasus (jal) and holly (khas), moss, wild vine, ivy, and other creeping plants. Medium altitude mountains are the realm of the lofty oriental beech (rash; Fagus orientalis), associated with oaks (balut), lime-trees (namdar), maples (afra), and elms (narvan; qq.v.). The upper mountain level, between 1800 and 2200 m, has remnants of a quite poorer forest of stunted oaks (uri; Quercus macranthera) and hornbeams (Carpinus orientalis). Alpine meadows, climate at higher altitudes, have often replaced these upper mountain forests, some of them, on highest ridges or sheltered slopes, show distinctly xerophytic features.

The so-called Mediterranean island around Rudbar and Manjil is conspicuous through its specific vegetation, natural as well as cultivated, i.e., its very sparse cypress forests and its olive-groves.

The weather system in Lahijan is more favorable than the other points in the Gilan. It has warmer winters and cooler summers. Freezing temperatures are seldom reported in the coastal areas; however it is not odd for Lahijan to experience periods of near blizzard conditions during the winter. The amount of rainfall in Lahijan depends on the winds bearing vapor that blow from the North West in winter, from the East in spring and from the West in summer and autumn. These winds carry the vapor and humidity towards the plains causing heavy and prolonged rainfalls.

Tea

Tea in Iran

The history of tea in Iran starts at the end of the 15th century. Before that coffee was the main beverage in Iran. However, most of the coffee producing countries were located far from Iran, making shipping very difficult. With a major tea producing country, China, located on a nearby trading path, "the silk road", the shipping of tea was much easier. This was the main reason that, over time, tea became much more popular in Iran. As a result, the demand for tea grew, and the more tea was consumed, the larger the volume of imports had to be in order to match the consumption.

Iranians failed in their first attempt to cultivate tea in their own country in 1882 with seeds which were imported from India. In 1899, Prince Mohammad Mirza known as "Kashef Al Saltaneh" who was born in Lahijan, imported Indian tea and started its cultivation in Lahijan. Kashef, who was the first mayor of Tehran and an Iranian ambassador to India under British rule, knew that the British would not allow him to learn about the secrets of tea production, as it was their biggest business in India at the time. So being fluent in French, the prince pretended to be a French laborer and started to work in the tea plantations and factories to learn how to produce tea. Ultimately his plan was to take back some tea saplings to Iran to cultivate. He was successful in this endeavor only because of his diplomatic immunity which stopped the British from searching his secretly stashed saplings. At the time, Kashef brought 3000 saplings into his country from the Northern part of India, Kangra. He started the cultivation in the region of Gilan, south of the Caspian Sea.  In Gilan, the climate is well suited for the cultivation of tea, and the tea industry quickly expanded in regions of Gilan and Mazanderan. Kashef's mausoleum in Lahijan is now part of "Iran's National Tea Museum".

In 1934 the first modern style tea factory was built. Now there are up to 107 tea factories and a total of 32,000 hectare of tea farms.

Most of the farms are located on the hillsides of Iran, similar to the farms in Darjeeling. These farms produce an orthodox style of black tea. The color of Iranian tea is red and its taste is fairly light.

In 2009, the total production of black tea was approximately 60,000 tons.

Tea in Lahijan

Historically, Lahijan is the first town in Iran to have tea plantations. With its mild weather, soil quality and fresh spring water, Lahijan stands to have the largest area of tea cultivation in Iran.

But today the country's tea industry is deep in trouble as the verdant gardens that once sustained millions of farmers and their workers are used only for grazing and other personal purposes. Despite having one of the world's most avid tea drinking populations, the Iranian tea economy is reeling from an influx of foreign imports and smugglers who, as per the complaints of local traders, often have close family ties to powerful figures in the Islamic government. As a consequence, Lahijan, this historic capital of Iran's tea industry which was once a lush vista of tea bushes is now occupied by real estate. These building and structures are built by tea factory owners who have moved into real estate in response to their industry's decline. Several of the town's tea mills are derelict. Others are at a stand-still or operating at half capacity. Some 40% of the half-million tea farmers in tea-rich Gilan province have gone out of business, because the factories are no longer buying their crops. Hundreds of thousands of pickers have been forced out of work.

Cookies (Kulucheh)
Lahijan's cookies (Kulucheh) are well-known and sold all across the world. Culucheh is a traditional Persian-style filled cookie. It has a shell that encrusts a soft filling. The filling comes in different variety of flavors like cocoa, walnut, or coconut. For centuries, using traditional methods, these types of cookies have been produced in Gilan. Noosheen, Grand naderi, Naderi, Nadi and Peyman brands are four famous cookie producers in Lahijan.

Notable people from Lahijan
Mohammad Ali Mojtahedi Gilani - Founder of Sharif University of Technology and Principal of Alborz High School.
Hazin Lahiji - Iranian Poet and Scholar
Sheikh Zahed Gilani - Grandmaster of the famed Zahediyeh Sufi Order at Lahijan
Farideh Ghotbi (1920–2000), mother of Farah Diba Pahlavi, former Shahbanu.
Hassan Zia-Zarifi - Iranian intellectual and one of the founders of the communist guerrilla movement in Iran
Bijan Najdi - Poet and Writer
Reza Qotbi - Head of Iranian National TV
Abolhassan Ziyā-Zarifi, public health specialist

Special ceremony

Karb (Kareb or cymbal) is made of two pieces of thick stick which are held by the player's two hands through a leather belt. This apparently replaces the dangerous stone beating. Karb is normally played in groups through special rhythm and is popular in Aran, Kashan, some districts in Semnan, as well as Sabzevar and Lahijan. Stone (karb) beating is symbolic rite which is popular in several parts of the country accompanied by special melodies. Normally two pieces of stone are beaten on the sides of the mourner by special manners and movements accompanied by lamentation song. Apparently, as a result of the physical damage caused by stones on the body, wood stick is gradually replacing stone. Lately, instead of stone beating, other terms such as Karbzani or Karebzani, playing cymbals and ratchets are used. In Mazandaran and some other regions, like Komesh, south of Alborz Mountains, the term Kareb and in Gilan the term Karb and in Aran (Kashan), cymbal is customary. This ceremony needs considerable physical strength by the performers and is popular in Lahijan and Aran, a district in Kashan, as well as Semnan and Sabzevar. Karna Nawazi: Karna (trumpet or horn). At certain villages in Gilan such as Mashk, Lasht, and Rudbeneh in Lahijan, long Karnas (trumpets or horns) are used in Ashura ceremony. The main body of the trumpet or horn is made of reed at the end of which it has a bend like a staff made of squash. It has a wooden mouthpiece at the other end of the trumpet to blow into the pipe. This special trumpet is used both in passion play and other Ashurayi ceremonies and is called martyrdom song. At certain rituals, one of the two singers and a group of Karna players play alternately.

Neighborhoods and Districts

District
Keshavarzi - Khamir Kalaye - Gharib Abad - Amir Shahid - Pordesar - Shishe Garan - Ordubazar - Khazar St. - Karegar (Shahid Rajayi)- Andisheh - Shahrake Salman - Shahrake Janbazan - Yousef Abad - Chahar Padeshahan - Sardare Jangal - Shoron Maleh - Khoramshahr - Ghiam St. - Bolvar St. - Nima St. - Jire Sar - Koucheh Bargh - Malek-e-Ashtar - Bazkia Gorab - Shaghayegh St. - East & West Kashef St. - Hazin St. - Sheikh Zahed Village - 22 Aban - Shahid Karimi St. - Bazar Rooz 1 2 3 4 - Shahrake Tarbiat Mo'allem - Shahrake Farhangian - Kamarbandi - Pomp Benzin - Golestan Alleies - Azadegan St. - Taleghani St. - Sher Bafan - Ghasab Mohaleh - Lashidan-e-Hokomati - Lashidan - Tarbiat Mo'allem St. - Assyed Yamani Alley - Abshar & Damaneh -  Gabaneh - Karvan Sara Bar - Fayath St. - Hassan Bigdesht - Haji Abad - Asour Meli - Javaher Poshteh - Kord-e-Mahaleh - Namak Abi - Koi Zamani - . . .

Neighborhoods
Soustan or Sustan is a small village in southern Lahijan which is divided into two districts, Soustan, the up   . . . Soustan, the down. In the southeast of the village, there is a natural pool which locals call it, Soustan'sal. There is also a natural island covered with old trees at the middle of the pool. The pool can be regarded as a major tourist hub in the area. The pool is used for irrigating tea fields and paddy lands across the village. There is also a sand mine (open mine) near the pool, Shin'chal. Contractors extract tens of thousands tones of sand, annually, from the area.

Kat'schel is a small village in eastern Lahijan. It is the nearest village to Soustan.

Bijar Booneh - Kuh Bijar - Abas Abad - Amir Kalayeh - Bijar Bagh - Satle Sar - Bakhshi Sara - Chelayeh - Sar Choshmeh - Zomeidan - Alisorood - Shin Nesa - Kuroe - Doongahi - Aseyyed Hosseini - Gombol - Kobaneh - Bejayeh - Laliman - Loleman - Ahandan - Nakhjir Kelayeh - Sareshkeh - . . .

Tourist hubs

Sheitan Koh (Satan's Hill) and its waterfall - Sareshke - Baam-e-Sabz - Lahijan Pool (Estakhr) -  the Tomb of the Four king (Char Padeshahan) - Golshan Bath - Sheikh Zahed Gilani Tomb - Shen Chal & Sustan Pool - Lahijan Daily Markets No.1 and No.2 - Iran National Tea Museum - Brick Bridge (pole Kheshti) - Amjadossoltan (Tomb of Farah Pahlavi(Diba)'s ancestor - National Library) - Lahidjan gondola - At'ah Kuh - Bulvar  . . .

Lahijan Pool

In the eastern part of Lahijan and at peak of the mountain, green and covered with bush is the area called Sheitankuh. In the past, it was called Shahneshin. There is a large pool with an area of 17 hectares and a depth of 4 meters in the reservoir water to irrigate rice fields. It is fed by the water flowing from the mountain. There is a beauty in the middle of the lake (in the past it was called "between the backs") which is attached to the south edge with a long concrete bridge. The length of this pool is about 2 km, which is located next to a beautiful boulevard and surrounds the pool all around. It is one of the most important sightseeing and entertainment centers. It is said that this pool was built by the order of Shah Abbas Safavid and in the part of its island, a huge palace for itself to be inhabited when it comes to Lahijan. At present, no trace of the building remains.

Cuisine
The following are some popular dishes in Lahijanian cuisine:

Mirza Ghassemi, Torshe'tare, Bademjan'khoroush, Sir'vabichke Morgh-e-Lako, Baghali ghatogh, Torshe Tare, Koii Khorosh, Sir ghalieh, Alo Mosama,  Naz Khatoon, Chaghar Tameh, Anarbij,  Shesh Andaz, Shirin Tare, Sirabij,  Khali Ovei, Chakhardameh, Motonjen, Loongi, Ghorabij, Mahi Febij, Vavishkah, Torshe Shami, Shami, Halichoe, Kaleh kabab, Tabironey.

Cinema and Theater Centers

There were two movie centers in Lahijan, Be'sat and Shahr-e-Sabz. It was once an important destination for the people of Lahijan. However, around 10 years ago, because of economic meltdown in the city, both movie centers went bankrupt, resulting in their shut down. Despite this, Shahr-e-Sabz was rebuilt and re-opened in 2012.

Universities and Schools
There are two kinds of university in Lahijan, state and non-state (semi-private) universities.

State Universities
 Hazrat Zeinab School of Nursing and Midwifery, East Gilan
 Lahijan Payam-Noor University
 Tarbiat Modarres College, Lahijan

Non-state Universities
 Islamic Azad University, Lahijan Branch

Gallery

References

External links

Populated places in Lahijan County
Cities in Gilan Province
Populated places on the Caspian Sea